Pamela Mogen (born October 18, 1953), better known by the pen name Pamela Aidan,  is an American writer. Her novels are Jane Austen fan fiction, based on Pride & Prejudice.

Biography
Pamela Aidan was born in Phoenixville, Pennsylvania, United States. She has a master's degree in Library and Information Science from the University of Illinois at Urbana-Champaign, and has been a librarian for over 30 years.  She and her husband Michael live in Coeur d'Alene, Idaho; they each have three grown children from previous marriages.

While Jane Austen's Pride and Prejudice has been her favorite novel since high school.  The author credits the 1995 BBC and A&E TV miniseries, of the story for inspiring her to write her first regency novel.  An Assembly Such as This became the start of her Fitzwilliam Darcy, Gentleman trilogy (former title was The Chronicles of Pemberley).

Bibliography

Fitzwilliam Darcy, Gentleman
A Lesson in Honour (2010)
An Assembly Such as This (2003)
Duty and Desire (2004)
These Three Remain (2005)

External links 

 Pamela Aidan's author page at Simon & Schuster
 Pamela Aidan's author page at Amazon.com
 Pamela Aidan's page at Wytherngate Press

References 

21st-century American novelists
American romantic fiction writers
American women novelists
Novelists from Idaho
1953 births
Living people
Women romantic fiction writers
21st-century American women writers